Isocybus is a genus of parasitoid wasps belonging to the family Platygastridae.

The species of this genus are found in Europe and Northern America.

Species:
 Isocybus antennalis Kieffer, 1916
 Isocybus ascendens Kieffer, 1913

References

Platygastridae
Hymenoptera genera